Phanerodiscus is a genus of flowering plants. In the APG IV system, the genus is placed in the family Olacaceae. Other sources place it in the segregate family Aptandraceae.

Its native range is Madagascar.

Species:

Phanerodiscus capuronii 
Phanerodiscus diospyroidea 
Phanerodiscus perrieri

References

Olacaceae
Santalales genera